Bee and PuppyCat is an American adult animated streaming television series created and written by Natasha Allegri. The series revolves around Bee (voiced by Allyn Rachel), an unemployed woman in her early twenties, who encounters a mysterious creature named PuppyCat (voiced by the Vocaloid program Oliver). She adopts this apparent cat-dog hybrid, and together they go on a series of temporary jobs to pay off her monthly rent. These bizarre jobs take the duo across strange worlds out in space. The original series was produced by Frederator Studios with the animation initially outsourced to South Korean studio Dong Woo Animation.

The series originated with a web pilot in 2013, followed by a Kickstarter-supported first season which was released on YouTube from 2014–16. 

A second season titled Bee and PuppyCat: Lazy in Space was produced and billed for a 2019 release on VRV, but it was delayed and leaked online in 2020. 

Netflix later commissioned three additional episodes re-adapting the pilot and first season, and then packaged these along with the Lazy in Space episodes. The complete rebooted series was released on Netflix in 2022. KaBoom! Studios also published a comic book adaptation from 2014–16.

On January 4, 2023, Genius Brands announced that they would sell a 50% stake in the series to Toho International, the US-based division of Japanese film studio Toho.

Plot
Bee is a cheerful, eccentric young woman in her early twenties who is habitually fired from menial, low-paying jobs. On her way home from a failed job opportunity, PuppyCat, a strange, mysterious creature, falls from the sky. She takes him in and, when he sees that she is broke and unemployed, PuppyCat teleports himself and Bee to an alternate dimension where they are given a job by TempBot, a gigantic, intelligent television screen. Despite the dangers that this line of temporary jobs would pose, Bee finds that she has a talent for the work and that it pays well enough for her to disregard the dangers.

An ongoing plot element of the series is PuppyCat's past, revealed to be a space outlaw whose love for a space princess ended with him being cursed into his current state by a group of warlocks who constantly attempt to capture him wherever he goes. Other plot elements include Bee being revealed to be a robot, her relationship with the Wizard family and their youngest Deckard, a talented chef with a crush on her who eventually attends cooking school at her behest, and Bee's curiously young landlord Cardamon struggling with his work while caring for his comatose mother Violet. It all comes to a head in the second season finale when the island on which the story takes place on is revealed to be Puppycat and Violet's spaceship, which is finally repaired as the group leaves Earth when the Warlocks attack their planet.

Characters

Main

Bee: Bee is a young woman who physically appears to be in her 20s and meets PuppyCat after being fired for sleeping on the job, becoming a temp worker who takes assignments from TempBot along with wardrobe changes for whatever planet she is assigned to. Bee has a strong dislike of water and also knows the Wizard family for years with Cas noting her lack of aging, Bee is later revealed in "Donut" to be a robot created by her father. In the second season finale, Bee is heavily damaged in saving Moulli while sentient parts of her body use the wish crystal shards on Moulli's person to become energy beings in Bee's likeness.
PuppyCat: The mysterious creature that is Bee's companion and roommate, named for his appearance and being an egocentric jerk. He does not speak and instead communicates with beeping sounds provided by the Vocaloid Oliver. He would later be revealed to be originally a candy hunter known as the Space Outlaw, who led a bounty hunting group called Team PuppyCat. But he ended up in his current form when he fell in love with a Space Princess who tricked him so the Warlocks can seal him away, only for their attempted sealing spell to unintentionally deform the Space Outlaw into PuppyCat.
TempBot: Also referred to as AssignBot, is a series of robots that each act as a temporary employment agent for PuppyCat with a shared memory bank that allows them to identify their temp workers. In the pilot episode, TempBot is voiced by Marina Sirtis, Hannah Hart for "Farmer", Roz Ryan for "Cats", Ellen McLain for "Game", Joan Koplan for "Wedding", Leah Jungwirth for "Again for the First Time", Kathy Najimy for "Who Would Want This?", Terri Hawkes for "What Do You Want to Be?", "Little Fingers", and "Why Don't You Help Me", Suzanne Berhow for "Gentle Touch", Diana Garnet for "My Favorite", Maile Flanagan for "Did You Remember", Alison Cowles for "Bird Friend", Natasha Allegri for "Two Clown Noses", and Emilia Sheldon for "Golden Eyes".
Deckard Wizard: Bee's friend, neighbor, and former coworker. Deckard works as a prep cook at the cat café from which Bee was fired. He harbors romantic feelings towards Bee. Deckard has a stutter and heterochromia. After the season one finale, Deckard leaves home in order to attend culinary school despite initial reluctance to leave Bee and home. He returns home in the second season finale.
Cas Wizard: Deckard's sister and roommate who was a former wrestler and worked at Howell's cat café before becoming a freelance computer programmer seen working in Java. She is the only one of her family who takes note of Bee's inability to age and the strangeness that occurs around their home. Like her brothers, Cas is also named after a wizard; her full name is Castaspella, which is also the name of a character from the She-Ra franchise.
Cardamon: Cardamon is a young boy who is Bee's landlord, business-like and mature for his age. He takes care of his comatose mother Violet, whom he regards as a "princess." He also has a dog named Sticky. The second season depicts his stress of being a landlord, having little to no adult supervision, being bullied in school, and finding ways of disposing the blobs that have taken over his apartment. In the season 2 finale, Violet places him back in stasis with her.
Toast: Toast is the 11th ranked wrestler from Cas' former wrestling team and holds a grudge against Cas' departure, as it leaves her to be the lowest-ranking member on the team. She intrudes into Cas' home life as a result and constantly picks fights with her, marrying Merlin and giving birth to their twin children.
Crispin Wizard: Cas and Deckard's third oldest brother who works in a garage as a mechanic. He has an interest in clowns since he ran away to the circus because his family accidentally forgot his 12th birthday. He incorporates clowns in his "art" which ranges from sculptures to cars. Crispin and Bee used to be in a relationship and lived together in Bee's apartment until he moved out. He still harbors some romantic feelings for Bee.

Recurring
Howell Wizard: Howell is the manager of the cat café and the middle child of the Wizard siblings.
Wesley Wizard: The second oldest of Cas and Deckard's siblings who's an avid fisherman.
Merlin Wizard: The oldest of Cas and Deckard's siblings who accidentally gets Toast pregnant, becoming her "unwed" husband as a result. He is also a doctor.
Tim Wizard: The fifth oldest of Cas and Deckard's siblings. He is quiet and has a journal of everyone's secrets.
Bird: Bee's scientist father who mysteriously disappeared.
Warlocks: The series antagonists who are tasked to hunt down Puppycat, placing their arms through a portal into space which turns them into enlarged limbs that fumble around for their quarry.
Moully: A giant cat who befriends Bee, able to teleport to anyone's location if he possesses an item of theirs. A former maker of magical wish granting donuts. Though he escapes the Warlocks grip after they grabbed him during their attack on the Donut Planet, he ends up being controlled by them before Bee snaps him out of it at great cost to her body.
Doublemouth: A monster who used to be the Space Outlaw's strict teacher, serving as the first enemy Bee and PuppyCat encounter during their first temp job together.
Pretty Patrick: The host of Bee and Puppycat's favorite show, who also happens to be the mayor of the island.
Narb: A convenience store worker.

Guest
Violet: Cardamon's comatose mother who is revealed to be PuppyCat's partner when he was the Space Outlaw, the two being childhood friends. In the second season, after Cardamon gave his mom half of a wish donut in an attempt to revive her, Violet begins shedding tears with the wish-altering properties of a wish crystal that gradually fill up their apartment. Violet briefly reawakens in the second season finale, revealing to actually be in stasis before returning to it with Cardamon until Bee's father has been found.

Ms. Coffee: Cardamon's Teacher.
Mr. Assam: Ms. Coffee's boyfriend.
Boss: Moully's overbearing boss on the Donut Planet who lost his livelihood. He was voiced by Tommy Wiseau in "Donut", and Eric Bauza for "Golden Eyes" and the season 1 remake.
Mister Cup
Ross
Sugar Cube
Claire
Dinosaur Kid
John Hammerbottom
Heart Head
Cathead
Harlequin Turtlebottom
Fish Girl
Cooking Prince
Wiggly Worm #1
Wiggly Worm #2
Fuzzy #1
Fuzzy #2
Worker #1
Worker #2
Worker #3
Snail #1
Snail #2
Grasshopper
Classmate #1
Classmate #2
Temp Worker
Wallace
Ladybug
Farmer
Crab
Cat #1
Cat #2
Elder Bird
Bird Citizen
Video Game Girl

Production

Original series
Bee and PuppyCat originated as a two-part eleven minute pilot, which was uploaded to Frederator Studios' YouTube channel Cartoon Hangover as part of Too Cool! Cartoons, a project Frederator referred to as a "big idea cartoon incubator". Part one went online on July 11, 2013, while part two went online on August 6, 2013, followed by a video with both parts together on August 7, 2013. The shorts also aired on Nintendo Video on November 1, 2013, and had a rerun on January 14, 2014.  While Part 2 aired on January 20, 2014, as a supposed rerun. 4 episodes from season 1 also released on the platform. One can still find the episodes on the 3DS's Nintendo eShop to this date.

After gaining popularity online, Cartoon Hangover started its first Kickstarter project to fund additional episodes. The Kickstarter started on October 15, 2013, and achieved its 600,000 goal with six days left; by the end, it had raised $872,133, funding ten 6-minute episodes, the first of which would air in the summer of 2014. At that time, Bee and PuppyCat became the most successful animation Kickstarter in history, #4 in the film/video category (behind only three Hollywood-based projects), and the #1 Kickstarter based on a YouTube video. Bee and PuppyCat: The Series premiered November 6, 2014 with a second two-part episode. While a few episodes were released early to Kickstarter backers in 2015, the majority of the season was released through 2016, with production concluding in March that year. The second half of the season was planned for a YouTube release in late Spring/early Summer 2016 but were released November 11, 2016 on VRV instead. The complete first series was eventually uploaded in full to the Cartoon Hangover YouTube channel on December 1, 2018.

Lazy in Space

In March 2017, Frederator announced that new episodes of Bee and PuppyCat were being written, initially earmarked for release on VRV. VRV at the time included Cartoon Hangover. In June 2018, the trailer for the continuation was released under the title Bee and PuppyCat: Lazy in Space, which would have aired sometime in 2019. An episode was screened in September 2019 at the Ottawa International Animation Festival, but did not release on VRV as planned. By 2019 VRV was suffering from several departing channels, and parent AT&T was more focused on HBO Max than VRV. In 2020, the 13 then-produced episodes were leaked onto Fred Seibert's Vimeo channel. The episodes were later removed from the platform, but not before several streaming websites managed to obtain copies. Seibert stepped down from his position as CEO of Frederator in August, though the company indicated that he would remain executive producer for current projects, including Bee and PuppyCat. 

In October 2020, it was announced that Netflix would be distributing the season in 2022. Described as a reboot, three new episodes were commissioned that retell the story of the original YouTube series, and these were presented along with the 13 episodes produced in 2019 as Lazy in Space. The episodes were renumbered accordingly.  The series launched on September 6, 2022.

Bee and PuppyCat: Lazy in Space is a joint production between Frederator Studios and Japanese studio Oriental Light & Magic (OLM). OLM's Los Angeles-based subsidiary Sprite Animation Studios also contributed to the project.

Episodes

Pilot (2013)
The pilot was released via the Cartoon Hangover YouTube channel, and Nintendo Video in two parts.

Original series (2014–16)
 Note: The entire series was directed by Larry Leichliter and written by Natasha Allegri, Madeleine Flores and Frank Gibson. It was billed simply as "The Series".

Lazy in Space (2022)
 Note: Episodes 4–16 were produced in 2019, while episodes 1–3 were produced in 2021 and did not include the moniker Lazy in Space.

Comics
Boom! Studios published a tie-in comic book through its KaBOOM! imprint. The comic was canceled after #11 in 2016 despite issues #12–#16 having already been solicited. Preview catalogues that year listed issues #12–#16, along with cover art and synopses.

Reception
Critical reception for the series has been mainly positive, though some fans have criticized the art and tone changes between the pilot and the Kickstarter-backed full series. In December 2014, critic Robert Lloyd of The L.A. Times listed it as one of the best TV shows of the year. The A.V. Club favorably rated the episode "Food Farmer", which they felt did a good job expanding Bee's character. The episode Little Fingers, then intended as the second episode of Lazy in Space, won best animated series at Ottawa International Animation Festival in 2019.

In other media
Characters from Bee and PuppyCat appeared on the cover for the second edition of Your Career in Animation: How to Survive and Thrive by David B. Levy.

Notes

References

External links
 Bee and PuppyCat  at Cartoon Hangover

American animated web series
Boom! Studios titles
Kickstarter-funded web series
American adult animated web series
2020s American adult animated television series
2022 American television series debuts
American adult animated drama television series
American adult animated comedy television series
American adult animated fantasy television series
Anime-influenced Western animated television series
English-language Netflix original programming
OLM, Inc.
2010s YouTube series
2013 web series debuts
Comedy webtoons
Fantasy webtoons
Drama webtoons
American comedy webcomics